The War Risk Insurance Act was a piece of legislation passed by the United States Congress in 1914 to ensure the availability of war risk insurance for shipping vessels and individuals during World War I.  It established a Bureau of War Risk Insurance within the Treasury Department to provide insurance policies and pay claims.  In 1917, the War Risk Insurance Act of 1917 amended the insurance program to make life insurance coverage available to sailors in the United States Merchant Marine.

Henry D. Lindsley served as director from December 1918 to August 1920.  He was followed by R. A. Cholmeley-Jones.

1914 Act and Associated U.S. Congressional Amendments
Chronological legislation relative to the 1914 public law and legislative revisions as pertaining to the War Risk Insurance Act.

References

External links

History of US Government Involvement in Insurance at the United States Department of Veterans Affairs

65th United States Congress